Sigurður "Siggi" Ragnar Eyjólfsson (born 1 December 1973) is an Icelandic football manager and former player. He was a professional forward in England and Belgium. From 2007 until 2013 he served as the head coach of Iceland women's national team, guiding them to the 2009 and 2013 editions of the UEFA Women's Championship.

Sigurður secured his place in Walsall history by scoring the third goal in the team's 3–1 win over Oldham Athletic in 1999, to secure promotion to the second tier of English football.

In August 2013 Sigurður resigned as coach of Iceland's women's team after seven years. He continued in his role as head of education at the Football Association of Iceland (KSÍ) and was looking to move into coaching men's football.

In January 2017, Sigurður joined Chinese side Jiangsu Suning women's team. He was then appointed by Chinese Football Association as the coach of China women's national football team in November.

Honours 
Úrvalsdeild champion 2002, 2003
Chinese Women's FA Cup champion 2017

References

External links

1973 births
Living people
Sigurdur Ragnar Eyjolfsson
Sigurdur Ragnar Eyjolfsson
Association football forwards
UNC Greensboro Spartans men's soccer players
Sigurdur Ragnar Eyjolfsson
Sigurdur Ragnar Eyjolfsson
Sigurdur Ragnar Eyjolfsson
Walsall F.C. players
Chester City F.C. players
K.R.C. Zuid-West-Vlaanderen players
Sigurdur Ragnar Eyjolfsson
English Football League players
Belgian Pro League players
Sigurdur Ragnar Eyjolfsson
Sigurdur Ragnar Eyjolfsson
Sigurdur Ragnar Eyjolfsson
Sigurdur Ragnar Eyjolfsson
Expatriate soccer players in the United States
Expatriate footballers in England
Expatriate footballers in Belgium
Sigurdur Ragnar Eyjolfsson
Sigurdur Ragnar Eyjolfsson
Sigurdur Ragnar Eyjolfsson
Lillestrøm SK non-playing staff
China women's national football team managers
Sigurdur Ragnar Eyjolfsson
Sigurdur Ragnar Eyjolfsson
Sigurdur Ragnar Eyjolfsson
Sigurdur Ragnar Eyjolfsson
Expatriate football managers in Norway
Expatriate football managers in China